The Vice-Admiral of Gloucestershire   was responsible for the defence of the county of Gloucestershire, England.

History
As a vice-admiral, the post holder was the chief of naval administration for his district. His responsibilities included pressing men for naval service, deciding the lawfulness of prizes (captured by privateers), dealing with salvage claims for wrecks and acting as a judge.

The earliest record of an appointment was of Edmund Brydges, 2nd Baron Chandos 1559–1573.

In 1863 the Registrar of the Admiralty Court stated that the offices had 'for many years been purely honorary' (HCA 50/24 pp. 235–6). Appointments were made by the Lord High Admiral when this officer existed. When the admiralty was in commission appointments were made by the crown by letters patent under the seal of the admiralty court.

Vice-admirals of Gloucestershire
This is a list of people who have served as Vice-Admiral of Gloucestershire.

Edmund Brydges, 2nd Baron Chandos 1559–1573
Giles Brydges, 3rd Baron Chandos 1573–1582
vacant
Edward Stafford, 3rd Baron Stafford 1586–1603
Henry Berkeley, 7th Baron Berkeley 1603–1613
vacant
Sir William Guise 1626–1642
English Interregnum
Thomas Chester 1660–1690
Sir John Guise, 2nd Baronet 1690–1695
Sir John Guise, 3rd Baronet 1696–1702
John Grobham Howe 1702–1712
John Howe 1712–1715
James Berkeley, 3rd Earl of Berkeley 1715–1736
Augustus Berkeley, 4th Earl of Berkeley 1737–1755
Matthew Ducie Moreton, 2nd Baron Ducie 1755–1762
Norborne Berkeley, 4th Baron Botetourt 1762–1766
Frederick Berkeley, 5th Earl of Berkeley 1766–1810
Henry Somerset, 6th Duke of Beaufort 1810–1835

References

External links
Institute of Historical Research*

Essex Review

Military ranks of the United Kingdom
Glouces
Vice-Admirals
Vice-Admirals